Sir Fergus Graham Burtholme Millar,  (5 July 1935 – 15 July 2019) was a British ancient historian and academic. He was Camden Professor of Ancient History at the University of Oxford between 1984 and 2002. He numbers among the most influential ancient historians of the 20th century.

Early life
Millar was educated at Trinity College, Oxford (BA) and fulfilled his National service in the aftermath of World War II. At Oxford he studied Philosophy and Ancient History, and received his Doctor of Philosophy (DPhil) degree there in 1962. In 1958, he was awarded a Prize Fellowship to All Souls College, Oxford, which he held until 1964. In 1959 he married Susanna Friedmann, with whom he had three children.

Academic career
Millar began his academic career as a fellow of Queen's College, Oxford, from 1964 to 1976. He then moved to University College London where he was Professor of Ancient History between 1976 and 1984. From 1984 until his retirement in 2002, he was Camden Professor of Ancient History at the University of Oxford. While Camden Professor, he was a fellow of Brasenose College, Oxford.

Millar served as editor of the Journal of Roman Studies from 1975 to 1979, and as president of the Classical Association for 1992/1993. He held various offices in the British Academy, to which he was elected a fellow in 1976. He was chairman of the Council for Academic Autonomy (see also Anthony D. Smith), a group of academic activists who sought to promote academic freedom and the separation of universities and research institutions from state control.

He was an authority in the field of ancient Roman and Greek history. His accolades included honorary doctorates from the University of Helsinki, and the Hebrew University of Jerusalem and elected memberships in foreign academies. His first book, A Study of Cassius Dio (1964), set the tone for his prolific scholarly production. He continued to produce important works, including The Roman Near East (31 BC – 337 AD) (1993), a path-breaking, non-Romano-centric treatment of this area. His further work included The Crowd in the Late Republic (1998) and The Roman Republic in Political Thought (2002).

Honours
Millar received the Kenyon Medal for Classics from the British Academy in 2005. He was knighted in the 2010 Queen's Birthday Honours.

In 1976, Millar was elected a Fellow of the British Academy (FBA), the United Kingdom's national academy for the humanities and social sciences. He was elected a Fellow of the Society of Antiquaries of London (FSA) in 1978.

Publications

See also
 Cassius Dio

Notes

External links
 
 Professor Fergus Millar staff page at the Faculty of Oriental Studies, University of Oxford
 Journal of Jewish Studies announcement of "History of the Jewish People in the Age of Jesus Christ."

1935 births
2019 deaths
British classical scholars
Historians of ancient Rome
Fellows of All Souls College, Oxford
Fellows of Brasenose College, Oxford
Fellows of the British Academy
Fellows of The Queen's College, Oxford
Fellows of Trinity College, Oxford
Academics of University College London
Foreign Members of the Russian Academy of Sciences
Knights Bachelor
Classical scholars of the University of London
Camden Professors of Ancient History
Fellows of the Society of Antiquaries of London
Presidents of The Roman Society
Presidents of the Classical Association